Vicenç Martínez Alama (12 January 1925 — 2 October 2018) was a Spanish footballer who played as a left back.

Club career
Born in Barcelona, Catalonia, Martínez began his career playing youth football for local L'Hospitalet club Penya Acció Catòlica. Martínez later joined Racing de Sants, before signing for FC Barcelona. On 19 October 1941, at the age of 16 years, 10 months and 5 days, Martínez became Barcelona's youngest ever player, starting in a 4–3 loss against Real Madrid in El Clásico at Real Madrid's Estadio Chamartín. The record still stands today, with Ansu Fati becoming the second youngest ever player only in 2019 at 16 years, 10 months and 23 days old. Martínez made six further appearances for Barcelona in the 1941–42 La Liga season, before being loaned out to Sabadell in 1942 for two years. Upon his return to Barcelona, manager Josep Samitier rejected an offer from Valencia for Martínez, before a meniscus injury halted Martínez's progression at the club.

In 1945, Martínez signed for Gimnàstic, making 38 league appearances for the club over the course of four seasons. In 1949, Martínez left Catalonia to sign for Linense in southern Andalucía. Martínez stayed with the club for one season, playing 26 times. In 1950, Martínez returned to Catalonia, joining Igualada, before signing for Sant Andreu the following year. In 1952, Martínez re-signed for Gimnàstic, making three appearances, before retiring in 1953 at the age of 28 due to injury, after a spell at Santboià.

Personal life
Due to the language policies of Francoist Spain, Martínez was also referred to as Vicente, as well as the Catalan name of Vicenç. On 2 October 2018, Martínez died, survived by his two sons Vicenç and Lluís.

References

1925 births
2018 deaths
Spanish footballers
Footballers from Barcelona
Association football defenders
FC Barcelona players
CE Sabadell FC footballers
Gimnàstic de Tarragona footballers
Real Balompédica Linense footballers
UE Sant Andreu footballers
FC Santboià players
La Liga players
Segunda División players